Pioneer Cemetery is a historic cemetery located at Sidney in Delaware County, New York, United States. It is a community burial ground with the earliest recorded interment dated to 1787.  Burials date from 1787 to 1890 and cemetery records indicate 275 burials.

It was listed on the National Register of Historic Places in 2007.

Gallery

See also
 National Register of Historic Places listings in Delaware County, New York

References

External links
 
 

Cemeteries on the National Register of Historic Places in New York (state)
National Register of Historic Places in Delaware County, New York
1787 establishments in New York (state)
Cemeteries in Delaware County, New York